Lee Tuk-young (Hangul: 이특영, born 2 December 1989) is a South Korean archer, who won the gold medal in the team competition at the 2006 Asian Games.

References

Living people
1989 births
South Korean female archers
Place of birth missing (living people)
Asian Games medalists in archery
Archers at the 2006 Asian Games
Archers at the 2014 Asian Games
World Archery Championships medalists
Asian Games gold medalists for South Korea
Medalists at the 2006 Asian Games
Medalists at the 2014 Asian Games
21st-century South Korean women